Jessica Gregg (born March 16, 1988) is a former Canadian short track speed skater.

Personal life
Born in Edmonton, Alberta, Jessica comes from a strong pedigree of skaters as her mother Kathy Vogt was a two time Olympian in the sport and her father Dr. Randy Gregg was a member of the Edmonton Oilers dynasty in the 1980s. Her sister Sarah Gregg was an international speed skater and her brother Jamie Gregg was a member of the national team for the 500 m in Long Track Speed Skating; who joined his sister at the 2010 and 2014 Winter Olympics.

Career

Jessica Gregg was the only member of the 2010 Canadian Olympic short track team outside of Quebec. Jessica won her first ever World Cup gold medal in 500 m short track speedskating in February 2009.

Gregg won a bronze medal in the 500 metres during the 2009 World Short Track Speed Skating Championships, she also won another bronze in the women's 3000 m relay at the same championship. During the 2008 World Short Track Speed Skating Championships she won a silver medal as participant in the women's relay along with fellow speed skaters Kalyna Roberge, and Tania Vicent. She won her first World Championship gold medal in Sofia in 2009. Going into the 2010 Olympics, Gregg was a medal contender in the 500 m and the 3,000 m relay. In the final at the Vancouver Olympics Gregg suffered through numerous first corner falls and restarts both in the quarterfinals and finals. In the final she was pushed out of the way by Arianna Fontana and was out of the race by the end of the first corner. Gregg finished 4th in the 500 m. On February 24, she won a silver medal in the 3,000 metre relay, along with Tania Vicent, Kalyna Roberge and Marianne St-Gelais.

On February 4, 2016 she announced her retirement.

References

External links
 Profile of Jessica Gregg by CTV
 Jessica Gregg blog on her family ties to sport and the Olympics

1988 births
Living people
Canadian female short track speed skaters
Olympic medalists in short track speed skating
Olympic short track speed skaters of Canada
Olympic silver medalists for Canada
Short track speed skaters at the 2010 Winter Olympics
Medalists at the 2010 Winter Olympics
Speed skaters from Edmonton
21st-century Canadian women